Naledi Local Municipality was a local municipality in the Free State province in South Africa. On 3 August 2016 it was disestablished and merged into the Mangaung Metropolitan Municipality. The name Naledi is a Sesotho word meaning "a star". The principal towns in the area of the disestablished municipality are Dewetsdorp and Wepener.

Main places
The 2001 census divided the municipality into the following main places:

Politics 
The municipal council consisted of eight members elected by mixed-member proportional representation. Four councillors were elected by first-past-the-post voting in four wards, while the remaining four were chosen from party lists so that the total number of party representatives was proportional to the number of votes received. In the election of 18 May 2011 the African National Congress (ANC) won a majority of six seats on the council.
The following table shows the results of the election.

References

External links
+ Official website

+ Naledi Local Municipality

Former local municipalities of South Africa